Claudius Ippolitovich Shenfer (26 May 1885 -   18 May 1946) was a Soviet scientist in the field of Electrical engineering, professor, academician of the USSR Academy of Sciences.

Biography 
He was born in 1885 in the Radviliškis.

In 1904 he entered the Warsaw Polytechnic Institute. During the Februar Revolution of 1905-1907 he moved to Moscow. In 1906 he entered the mechanical department of the Imperial Moscow Technical School.

In 1911-1912 he was on a scientific mission in Germany, where he worked on questions of experimental research of commutation of collector machines of alternating current. Returning to Russia he taught at the university.

Since 1930 he worked as a teacher at the Moscow Power Engineering Institute. During the Great Patriotic War, Shenfer transferred 100,000 rubles to the Defense Fund.

He dealt with the theory and design of electrical machines (switching work in collector electrical machines, cascade schemes, transient regimes, electricity recovery). He is the author of textbooks on electric machines.

Awards and prizes: The Stalin Prize of the first degree (1943) - for many years of outstanding achievements, the Order of Lenin (1945), the Order of the Red Banner of Labor (1940).

Literature 
 "Collector motors of alternating current", 1933.
 "Dynamos and DC motors", 1937.
 "Asynchronous machines", 1938.

References 

Moscow Power Engineering Institute alumni
Soviet engineers
Stalin Prize winners
1885 births
1946 deaths